FK Takovo is a football club from Gornji Milanovac, Serbia. The club is a part of the Sports Society Takovo. The team plays in Serbian League West, the third tier of the Serbian football league system.

The club was founded in July 1911 and is one of the oldest clubs in Serbia. It is named after nearby historic village of Takovo, where the Second Serbian uprising started in 1815.

History

The club was founded in July 1911 through the initiative of Gornji Milanovac's school youth led by Dušan Borisavljević and Petar Trifunović, who brought the first football ball, that same year, from Belgrade to Milanovac.

FK Takovo in recent years

Notable former players
 Radmilo Ivančević, 5 appearances for Yugoslavia Olympic team
 Dragan Rogić
 Svetozar Pavlović
 Predrag Radmilac
 Saša Zorić (Youth team), 2 appearances for FR Yugoslavia national team.
 Slobodan Santrač (Youth team), 8 appearances for Yugoslavia national team.

Notes and references

Sources

External links
 Official website 
 FK Takovo at srbijasport.net

Takovo
Takovo
1911 establishments in Serbia
Gornji Milanovac